This is a list of British television related events from 1975.

Events

January
2 January – The police drama series The Sweeney premieres on ITV, with John Thaw and Dennis Waterman.
6 January – Due to financial cutbacks at the BBC, BBC1 scales back its weekday early afternoon programming. Consequently, apart from schools programmes, adult education and live sport, the channel now shows a trade test transmission between 2pm and the start of children's programmes and when not broadcasting actual programmes, BBC2 begins fully closing down on weekdays between 11:30am and 4pm. 
22 January–26 February – Drama series The Love School, about the Pre-Raphaelite Brotherhood, is broadcast on BBC2.

February
25 February - BBC1 begin showing the American western family drama Little House on the Prairie, starring Michael Landon.

March
14 March – After less than two years on the air, The Bristol Channel closes.
24 March – Wellingborough Cablevision closes.

April
1 April – Premiere of Edward the Seventh, a drama series made by ATV in 13 one-hour episodes and based on the biography of Edward VII by Sir Philip Magnus.
3 April – Meg Richardson (Noele Gordon) marries Hugh Mortimer (John Bentley) on the soap opera Crossroads.
4 April – The Richard Briers and Felicity Kendal-starred Sitcom The Good Life makes its debut on BBC1.
13 April – The Golden Shot airs its final episode on ITV after an eight-year run.

May
31 May – Jim'll Fix It makes its debut on BBC1.

June
11 June – A pilot of the sitcom The Melting Pot, written by and starring Spike Milligan with Neil Shand, is broadcast on BBC2. The following year, a full series of six episodes is recorded but never broadcast.

July
5 July – BBC1 launches the long-running Summer variety show Seaside Special. 
14 July – New Broadcasting House (Manchester) starts broadcasting programming for BBC North West. It becomes fully operational by September.
20 July – ITV first airs the Bob Monkhouse-hosted game show Celebrity Squares.

August
2 August – BBC2 launch a season of Saturday evening horror movie double bills with Midnight Movie Fantastic. It would continue to be shown until 1983.
13 August – BBC1 begins showing the US detective series The Rockford Files, starring James Garner.

September
2 September – Runaround, the long-running children's game show hosted by comedian Mike Reid is first broadcast on ITV.
3 September – ITV begins showing the supernatural children's anthology series Shadows.
4 September – Gerry Anderson's live-action science fiction series Space: 1999 airs on ITV, starring Martin Landau.
19 September – BFBS Television broadcasts for the first time, in Celle, near Hanover in the  West Germany from Trenchard Barracks. The service consists of taped broadcasts from the BBC and ITV, flown to Germany from London which are then rebroadcast using low-power UHF transmitters.
19 September – John Cleese's much-loved hotel comedy series Fawlty Towers debuts on BBC2, with the episode A Touch of Class.
25 September – Yorkshire Television premieres Animal Kwackers, the British version of the American television series The Banana Splits Adventure Hour which ended almost six years earlier but shorter and very different from the American version. It goes on to air for 3 series.

October
1 October – The long-running arts documentary series Arena makes its debut on BBC2. 
28 October – ITV shows a James Bond film on British television for the first time: Terence Young's 1962 big screen debut of 007 in Dr. No, with Sean Connery starring as Ian Fleming's British Secret Agent.

November
No events.

December
9 December – 15th anniversary of the first episode of Coronation Street.
17 December 
The Thames Television film The Naked Civil Servant, based on Quentin Crisp's memoirs is broadcast on British television. The film stars John Hurt in the title role.
The final episode of Till Death Us Do Part is broadcast on BBC1.
23 December – The animated children's series Bod debuts on BBC1.
25 December – As part of the Christmas Day highlights BBC1 screens the UK television premiere of the 1939 MGM fantasy musical The Wizard of Oz, starring Judy Garland.  The film would go on to be shown regularly on the BBC during the Christmas period until the 1990s.  Also receiving a world television premiere on BBC1 is Butch Cassidy and the Sundance Kid starring Robert Redford and Paul Newman.

Debuts

BBC1
1 January – The Secret Garden (1975)
6 January Philbert Frog (1975)Public Account (1975–1978)The Changes (1975)
7 January – The Venturers (1975)
26 January – Anne of Avonlea (1975)
25 February – Little House on the Prairie (1974–1983)
5 March – You're on Your Own (1975)
9 March – The Master of Ballantrae (1975)
17 March – Hong Kong Phooey (1974)
4 April – The Good Life (1975–1978)
16 April – Survivors (1975–1977)
23 April – Wodehouse Playhouse (1975–1978)
24 April – Sam and the River (1975)
2 May – Private Affairs (1975)
31 May – Jim'll Fix It (1975–1994)
11 June – The Melting Pot (1975)
5 July – Seaside Special (1975–1979)
14 July – My Honourable Mrs (1975)
16 July – The Rough with the Smooth (1975)
27 July – Zot the Dog (1975)
9 August – Sportscene (1975–present)
13 August – The Rockford Files (1974–1980)
26 August – Oil Strike North (1975)
27 August – I Didn't Know You Cared (1975–1979)
29 August – Quiller (1975)
1 September – Angels (1975–1983)
2 September – The Growing Pains of P.C. Penrose (1975)
11 September – Days of Hope (1975)
24 September – The Hill of the Red Fox (1975)
26 September – The Invisible Man (1975)
5 October 
 Ballet Shoes (1975)
 Poldark (1975–1977)
 Little Monsters (1975–1978)
 Maya the Honey Bee (1975-1976)
12 October – On the Move (1975–1976)
15 October – Cooper (1975)
18 November – Emu's Broadcasting Company (1975–1980)
23 November – The Legend of Robin Hood (1975)
25 November – Francis Durbridge Presents: The Doll (1975)
4 December – State of Emergency (1975)
23 December – Bod (1975–1976)
31 December – Striker (1975)

BBC2
22 January – After That, This (1975)
22 January – The Love School (1975)
29 March – A Legacy (1975)
2 April – The Fight Against Slavery (1975)
3 May – The Girls of Slender Means (1975)
12 May – Rutland Weekend Television (1975–1976)
24 May – Looking for Clancy (1975)
13 June – Ten from the Twenties (1975)
18 June – The Poisoning of Charles Bravo (1975)
2 August – Midnight Movie Fantastic (1975)
19 September – Fawlty Towers (1975, 1979)
22 September – Madame Bovary (1975)
25 September – Making Faces (1975)
26 September – The Wild West Show (1975)
1 October – Arena (1975–present)
29 October – The Philanthropist (1975)
21 November – Trinity Tales (1975)
26 November – Moll Flanders (1975)
1 December – North and South (1975)
21 December – The Punch Review (1975–1977)
29 December – How Green Was My Valley (1975–1976)

ITV
2 January – The Sweeney (1975–1978)
4 January – Carry on Laughing (1975)
6 January – The Life of Riley (1975)
10 January – Dog of Flanders (1975)
12 January – Joby (1975)
14 January – Nightingale's Boys (1975)
15 January – Cilla's Comedy Six (1975)
15 February – The Hanged Man (1975)
19 March – The Wackers (1975)
 24 March – Noddy (1975)
1 April – Edward the Seventh (1975)
7 April – Sky (1975)
20 April – Winner Takes All (1975–1988, 1997)
21 April – Sadie, It's Cold Outside (1975)
26 April – Tarbuck and All That! (1975)
27 April – Doctor on the Go (1975–1977) 
7 May – The Loner (1975)
28 May – You Must Be Joking! (1975–1976) 
8 June – The Siege of Golden Hill (1975)
12 June – Dawson's Weekly (1975)
3 July – Three Comedies of Marriage (1975)
13 July – Against the Crowd (1975)
20 July – Celebrity Squares (1975–1979, 1993–1997, 2014–2015)
22 July – Johnny Go Home (1975)
23 July – Down the 'Gate (1975–1976)
2 August – The Summer Show (1975)
7 August – Comedy Premiere (1975)
8 August – Rule Britannia! (1975)
2 September – Runaround (1975–1981, 1985–1986)
3 September – Shadows (1975–1978)
4 September The Stars Look Down (1975)Space: 1999 (1975–1978)
6 September – Two's Company (1975–1979)
7 September – My Brother's Keeper (1975–1976)
8 September 
 Hogg's Back (1975–1976)
 My Son Reuben (1975)
9 September – Shades of Greene (1975–1976)
19 September – Larry Grayson (1975–1977)
25 September – Animal Kwackers (1975–1978)
8 October – It's a Lovely Day Tomorrow (1975)
14 October – Couples (1975–1976)
16 October – Get Some In! (1975–1978)
27 October – The Cuckoo Waltz (1975–1980)
17 December – The Naked Civil Servant (1975)
Unknown – The Brady Bunch (1969–1974)

Television shows

Changes of network affiliation

Returning this year after a break of one year or longerIvor the Engine (1959, 1975–1977)

Continuing television shows
1920sBBC Wimbledon (1927–1939, 1946–2019, 2021–present)

1930s
The Boat Race (1938–1939, 1946–2019)BBC Cricket (1939, 1946–1999, 2020–2024)

1940sCome Dancing (1949–1998)

1950sThe Good Old Days (1953–1983)Panorama (1953–present)Dixon of Dock Green (1955–1976)Crackerjack (1955–1984, 2020–present)Opportunity Knocks (1956–1978, 1987–1990)This Week (1956–1978, 1986–1992)Armchair Theatre (1956–1974)What the Papers Say (1956–2008)The Sky at Night (1957–present)Blue Peter (1958–present)Grandstand (1958–2007)

1960sCoronation Street (1960–present)Songs of Praise (1961–present)Z-Cars (1962–1978)Animal Magic (1962–1983)Doctor Who (1963–1989, 1996, 2005–present)World in Action (1963–1998)Top of the Pops (1964–2006)Match of the Day (1964–present)Crossroads (1964–1988, 2001–2003)Play School (1964–1988)Mr. and Mrs. (1965–1999)Call My Bluff (1965–2005)World of Sport (1965–1985)Jackanory (1965–1996, 2006) Sportsnight (1965–1997)It's a Knockout (1966–1982, 1999–2001)The Money Programme (1966–2010) Playhouse (1967–1982)Dad's Army (1968–1977)Magpie (1968–1980)The Big Match (1968–2002)Nationwide (1969–1983)Screen Test (1969–1984)

1970sThe Goodies (1970–1982)The Onedin Line (1971–1980)The Old Grey Whistle Test (1971–1987)The Two Ronnies (1971–1987, 1991, 1996, 2005)Love Thy Neighbour (1972–1976)Thunderbirds (1972–1980, 1984–1987)Clapperboard (1972–1982)Crown Court (1972–1984)Pebble Mill at One (1972–1986)Are You Being Served? (1972–1985)Rainbow (1972–1992)Emmerdale (1972–present)Newsround (1972–present)Weekend World (1972–1988)Pipkins (1973–1981)We Are the Champions (1973–1987)Last of the Summer Wine (1973–2010)That's Life! (1973–1994)Porridge (1974–1977)The Wheeltappers and Shunters Social Club (1974–1977)Happy Ever After (1974–1978)Rising Damp (1974–1978)Within These Walls (1974–1978)It Ain't Half Hot Mum (1974–1981)Tiswas (1974–1982)Wish You Were Here...? (1974–2003)

Ending this year
 31 March – Up Pompeii! (1969–1975, 1991–1992)
 7 April – Public Eye (1965–1975)
 12 April – My Old Man (1974–1975)
 13 April – The Golden Shot (1967–1975) 
 31 May – Vicky the Viking (1974-1975)
 17 June – Captain Pugwash (1957–1975, 1997–2002)
 23 June – Churchill's People (1974–1975)
 10 August – Top of the Form (1962–1975)
 29 August – Not On Your Nellie (1974–1975)
 6 December – Don't Drink the Water (1974–1975)
 17 December – Till Death Us Do Part (1965–1975)
 21 December – Upstairs, Downstairs (1971–1975, 2010–2012)
 31 December – Dog of Flanders (1975)
 Unknown – Watch with Mother (1952–1975)

Births
 15 January – Claire Marshall, BBC journalist
 13 February – Katie Hopkins, reality show contestant and journalist
 25 February – Naga Munchetty, presenter and journalist
 3 March – Patricia Potter, actress
 16 May – Charlotte Hawkins, journalist and newsreader
 21 May – Ruth Wignall, journalist and broadcaster
 27 May – Jamie Oliver, chef and television personality
 29 May – Mel B, singer (Spice Girls), actress and television presenter
 25 June – Sunetra Sarker, actress
 1 July – Trey Farley, television presenter
 2 July – Melanie Clark Pullen, actress (died 2022)
 15 July – Jill Halfpenny, actress
 17 July – Konnie Huq, television presenter
 22 July – Hannah Waterman, actress
 22 August – Sheree Murphy, actress
 25 August – Sarah Manners, actress
 25 September – Declan Donnelly, TV presenter and one half of Ant and Dec
 26 October – Michael Underwood, television presenter
 7 November – Francine Lewis, comedian, actress and model
 18 November – Anthony McPartlin, TV presenter and one half of Ant and Dec
 11 December – Dawn Steele, actress
 Unknown 
Jason Mohammad, radio and television presenter
Laura Jones, television journalist

Deaths
23 April – William Hartnell, 67, actor (Doctor Who).
18 October – Graham Haberfield, 33, actor (Coronation Street'').

See also
 1975 in British music
 1975 in British radio
 1975 in the United Kingdom
 List of British films of 1975

References